Cameron James Coventry (born 25 February 1991) is a historian at Federation University Australia who researches twentieth-century Australian history. Coventry is most notable for his 2021 work on former Australian Prime Minister Bob Hawke's involvement with the United States of America during the 1970s.

Education and political career
Coventry grew up in the village of Stirling, South Australia in the Adelaide Hills. He attended Prince Alfred College in Adelaide where he was captain of debating, editor of the school yearbook, and won Head of the River. After school Coventry studied at Adelaide Law School. In 2014 Coventry moved to Canberra to work in Senator Nick Xenophon's parliamentary office in the Australian Senate. He spent two years at Parliament, during which time he completed a degree in arts at the Australian National University, where he was educated by historian Frank Bongiorno.

Academic career
At the University of New South Wales and the Australian Defence Force Academy Coventry completed a Master of Arts under the direction of political scientist Clinton Fernandes, submitting a dissertation in 2018 called "The Origins of the Royal Commission on Intelligence and Security." The dissertation was later used by former Justice of the High Court of Australia Michael Kirby in his work. In 2017 he moved to Ballarat and began a PhD in 2019 for which he was awarded the university's stipendiary scholarship. In 2019, "Links in the Chain: British slavery, South Australia and Victoria" was published. This work generated debate in Adelaide and his adopted city of Ballarat about place-names honoring beneficiaries of slavery. In 2020 Coventry jointly presented the Annual Lecture of the History Council of South Australia in which he discussed the need to reconsider 'South Australian exceptionalism' in light of its dependence on slave money.

Coventry wrote an open letter to Ballarat City Council in 2021 denouncing its enclosure of the Ballarat Common that explained its long history and heritage significance. The letter was signed by 13 other scholars including Ian D. Clark. It provoked debate in the local paper, The Courier, about the overdevelopment of Ballarat and the loss of working class heritage. In 2022 the council indicated the creation of a new "great park" would be made from a portion of the old common.

Bob Hawke and the United States

In June 2021 the Australian Journal of Politics and History published "The 'Eloquence' of Robert J. Hawke: United States informer, 1973-79," which propounded the long-held suspicion that the former Prime Minister, Labor Party leader and ACTU President had collaborated with the United States Government in the 1970s. Coventry's article demonstrated by using documentary evidence that Hawke had handed considerable amounts of inside-information to US officials, undermining the causes he was publicly committed to. Coventry's article also named numerous other informers, including John Ducker, Billy Sneddon, Bill Hayden, Rupert Murdoch, David Combe and Don Willesee. Coventry later said the motivation for undertaking the research of the cables at the National Archives and Records Administration had been his recollections of media reports about the revelations of WikiLeaks which were "pertinent to the present debate about foreign interference – in the United States but also Australia."

The article attracted domestic and international media attention, including the front page of The Australian newspaper and as the lede weekend article on the Guardian Australia. Within a fortnight the article was the most read article in the Journal's near-seven decade history. Journalist Jeff Sparrow said of Coventry's work: "Not all of Coventry’s evidence is new. But, assembled as a package, it deals a blow to the Hawke legend. Everyone loves a larrikin. Nobody likes a snitch." It was subsequently reported that the publication of the article had prevented Labor Leader, Anthony Albanese, from rebranding himself as Australia's next Hawke-style consensus politician. The revelation of Hawke's relationship with the United States was discussed by Dominic Sandbrook and Tom Holland in their history podcast The Rest is History and was likened to the activities of Jim Callaghan in the United Kingdom at the same time.

The article was immediately rebuked by Hawke-Keating era politicians. A former ALP President, Stephen Loosely, said it was "nonsense" and "For someone half a century later to label these people informants, when they can't defend themselves, simply doesn't hold water." Another former Labor politician, Paul Everingham, said the informer argument was "balls." Hawke's authorised biographer wrote that the label "informant" or "spy" was "misleading" because Hawke had a close relationship with British officials as well. An academic reviewer of Troy Bramston's biography of Hawke noted that Coventry's article was "one of the few academic sources referenced by Bramston." Coventry's article was reviewed for the Melbourne Labour History Society by former secretary of the Victorian Trades Hall, Brian Boyd, which added further information about what was known of Hawke's US connections at the time.

References

Australian historians
Living people
Historians of Australia
Australian National University alumni
University of New South Wales alumni
University of Adelaide alumni
People educated at Prince Alfred College
People from Adelaide
Adelaide Law School alumni
1991 births